PBA 3x3 refers to the men's 3x3 basketball league of the Philippine Basketball Association (PBA).

History
The proposal to form PBA 3x3, a men's 3x3 basketball league, was a result of a joint partnership between the Philippine Basketball Association (PBA) and the Samahang Basketbol ng Pilipinas (SBP), the national sports association for basketball in the Philippines, as a means to help the Philippine national 3x3 team qualify for the 2024 Summer Olympics and subsequent editions after 3x3 became a regular discipline in the 2020 Summer Olympics. The concept for a PBA 3x3 league was proposed by Terrafirma governor Bobby Rosales in an annual board meeting. PBA 3x3 is proposed as a stand-alone program, similar to the PBA D-League which means that the 3x3 league is distinct from the main 5-a-side men's professional league of the PBA.

The PBA had prior involvement in 3x3. In 2014 and 2015, it has allowed some of its players to join Philippine-based teams to participate in masters tournaments of the FIBA 3x3 World Tour and organized the short-lived PBA Women's 3x3 which had one season in 2015, following the Philippines women's national team's promotion to Division I of the FIBA Asia Women's Championship.

The SBP also had partnered with Bounty Agro Ventures to organize the Chooks-to-Go Pilipinas 3x3, a men's 3x3 league, which helped garner enough FIBA 3x3 ranking points for the Philippine men's national team to earn a berth in the Olympic Qualifying Tournament for the 2020 Summer Olympics. Chooks-to-Go Pilipinas 3x3 has publicly welcomed the possible formation of a 3x3 league by the PBA and the SBP said that the existence of more competitive 3x3 tournaments is within its interest. There are plans to revive the women's 3x3 league as of February 2020.

The inaugural season was supposed to be held in 2020 but was postponed to 2021 due to the COVID-19 pandemic with the PBA preoccupied with plans to resume the season of its main league during that time.

The PBA 3x3 committee was formed in August 2020, with Alaska Aces governor, Richard Bachmann as its chairman. The committee held its first meeting on August 13, 2020. Eric Altamirano was also named as the league's first commissioner.

The PBA 3x3 inaugural season was initially scheduled to be held in parallel with the 2021 PBA season, which opened on April 11, 2021, but was further postponed. The inaugural PBA 3x3 season commenced on November 20, 2021.

Inaugural season

Format
The PBA 3x3 committee is leaning on scheduling games of the PBA 3x3 in between conferences of the main PBA league, to allow the franchise teams to field their top players in 3x3 matches.

Under FIBA 3x3 classification the league is a Level 4 tournament.

Teams

Franchise teams
Among the franchise teams of the PBA since the 3x3 league's inception, only the Converge FiberXers (Alaska Aces in 2021 season) has not fielded a team. Phoenix Super LPG Fuel Masters and Rain or Shine Elasto Painters have fielded teams in the past but their respective teams are currently on leave.

Guest teams

Inactive and former teams

References

3x3
3x3 basketball competitions
3x3 basketball in the Philippines
Proposed sports leagues
2021 establishments in the Philippines
Sports leagues established in 2021